Reischek's parakeet (Cyanoramphus hochstetteri) is a small green parrot confined to  Antipodes Island, one of New Zealand’s subantarctic islands, which it shares with a congener, the larger Antipodes parakeet.

Taxonomy
The common name commemorates pioneering naturalist and collector Andreas Reischek, who collected specimens of the parrot in 1888 and who named it Platycercus hochstetteri for the son of his friend, Austrian geologist Ferdinand von Hochstetter, who made a geological survey of New Zealand.

Reischek’s parakeet was previously considered to be a subspecies of the red-crowned parakeet C. novaezelandiae, which it resembles in appearance, but was later lumped with the Macquarie parakeet from Macquarie Island in a 2001 paper by Wee Ming Boon and others following an examination of the molecular systematics of the genus which found that many of the red-crowned parakeet subspecies should be elevated to full species.  However, subsequently the provenance of Boon et al.’s supposed Macquarie Island material was shown to be mistaken, originating from the Antipodes Islands instead.

Behaviour

Feeding
Reischek’s parakeet feeds on tussock flowers, leaves, seeds, berries as well as invertebrates such as fly larvae in the guano of the penguin colonies.  It also scavenges on the carcasses of petrels and albatrosses.

Conservation
Though the population of Reischek's parakeet is healthy, its limited distribution makes it potentially vulnerable to events such as the accidental introduction of rodents to its island home.  On the New Zealand Threatened Species classification it is listed as ‘range restricted’.

References

Reischek's parakeet
Birds of the Antipodes Islands
Endemic birds of New Zealand
Parrots of Oceania
Reischek's parakeet